Bezirk Wien-Umgebung was a district of the state of Lower Austria in Austria. The district comprised four non-contiguous districts on the outer fringes of Vienna: Klosterneuburg and Gerasdorf to the north of the city, Schwechat to its south-east and Purkersdorf on Vienna's western side.

Vienna International Airport, the headquarters of Austrian Airlines, and the headquarters of Niki are in the city of Schwechat, in the district.

The district existed from 1954 to 2016. In 2017 the municipalities became part of four adjacent districts.

Municipalities 
Suburbs, hamlets and other subdivisions of a municipality are indicated by lower dots.
 Ebergassing
 Ebergassing, Wienerherberg
 Fischamend
 Fischamend-Dorf, Fischamend-Markt
 Gablitz
 Gerasdorf bei Wien
 Gerasdorf, Föhrenhain, Kapellerfeld, Oberlisse, Seyring
 Gramatneusiedl
 Himberg
 Himberg, Velm, Pellendorf, Gutenhof
 Klein-Neusiedl
 Klosterneuburg
 Höflein an der Donau, Kierling, Klosterneuburg, Kritzendorf, Maria Gugging, Weidling, Weidlingbach
 Lanzendorf
 Leopoldsdorf
 Maria Lanzendorf
 Mauerbach
 Hainbuch, Mauerbach, Steinbach
 Moosbrunn
 Pressbaum
 Au am Kraking, Pfalzau, Pressbaum, Rekawinkel
 Purkersdorf
 Rauchenwarth
 Schwadorf
 Schwechat
 Kledering, Mannswörth, Rannersdorf, Schwechat
 Tullnerbach
 Irenental, Tullnerbach-Lawies, Untertullnerbach
 Wolfsgraben
 Zwölfaxing

Dissolution
The district Wien-Umgebung was dissolved in 2017; 13 municipalities in the South East became part of the Bruck an der Leitha District, namely Ebergassing, Fischamend, Gramatneusiedl, Himberg, Klein-Neusiedl, Lanzendorf, Leopoldsdorf, Maria Lanzendorf, Moosbrunn, Rauchenwarth, Schwadorf, Schwechat and Zwölfaxing. Six municipalities in the West became part of the Sankt Pölten-Land District, namely Gablitz, Mauerbach, Pressbaum, Purkersdorf, Tullnerbach and Wolfsgraben. Klosterneuburg in the North West became part of the Tulln District and Gerasdorf bei Wien in the North East became part of the Korneuburg District.

References